Best Of 11-Twelve is the fifth and latest studio album by Swedish pop singer Bosson. It was released in 2013 by Spinnup.

Track listing

References

2013 albums
Bosson albums